American alternative rock band Silversun Pickups has released six studio albums and 19 singles.

Albums

Studio albums

Compilations

EPs

Singles

Other charted songs

Music videos

Notes

References

External links
 Official website
 Silversun Pickups at AllMusic
 
 

Discographies of American artists
Alternative rock discographies